List of coats of arms of the districts in North Rhine-Westphalia, Germany

North Rhine-Westphalia
North_Rhine-Westphalia, districts
North Rhine-Westphalia-related lists
North Rhine-Westphalia